Loving You is the first soundtrack album by American rock and roll singer Elvis Presley. It was released by RCA Victor in mono, LPM 1515, in July 1957 to accompany his first starring film, Loving You (1957). Recording sessions took place on January 15, 16, 17, and 18, 1957, at the Paramount Pictures Scoring Stage, and on January 12, 13, 19, and February 23 and 24, 1957, at Radio Recorders in Hollywood. These are the first sessions where Steve Sholes is officially listed as producer. It spent ten weeks at No. 1 on the Billboard Top Pop Albums chart. It was certified Gold on April 9, 1968 by the Recording Industry Association of America.

Content
The soundtrack includes seven songs composed expressly for the movie Loving You from writers contracted to Elvis Presley Music and Gladys Music, the publishing companies owned by Presley and his manager, Colonel Tom Parker. An eighth song intended for but not appearing in the movie, "Don't Leave Me Now", was included on the album, and a new recording appeared on the soundtrack for his next film, Jailhouse Rock.

The previously released material comprises both sides of the single taken from the soundtrack, Presley's number one hit "(Let Me Be Your) Teddy Bear" backed with the film's title track, "Loving You". Producer Hal B. Wallis liked "Teddy Bear" so much that he insisted it be included in the movie. Songs were added to bring up the running time of the album, including the swing-era favorite "Blueberry Hill", which had been a big hit for Fats Domino in 1956. "Have I Told You Lately That I Love You?" had been done previously by the Sons of the Pioneers, as well as Bing Crosby with The Andrews Sisters. Cole Porter's "True Love", written for the 1956 musical film High Society, also made the album, either to feature a straightforward romantic song, or to give Presley and The Jordanaires an excuse for some close harmony singing. The practice of RCA augmenting soundtrack recordings with extra songs from non-soundtrack studio sessions to bring up the running time of the LP to acceptable lengths would become a commonplace occurrence with Presley soundtracks through the 1960s.

Reissues
RCA reissued the original 12-track album on compact disc in 1988. The album was reissued  in an expanded CD edition on April 15, 1997, appending eight tracks to the original album. All tracks derive from the same sessions, with three alternate takes, the remaining track from the Just For You EP, three single sides, including "Tell Me Why", which would wait almost nine years to be released, and a remake of the Sun master "When It Rains, It Really Pours," also released much later on the 1965 LP Elvis for Everyone. On January 11, 2005, Sony BMG reissued the album again, remastered using DSD technology with the six bonus tracks appended in standard fashion. A two-disc set was released on the Follow That Dream collectors label on January 12, 2006, with the bonus tracks and numerous additional takes.

Track listing

Original release
Chart positions for singles taken from the Billboard Pop Singles chart; for albums from the Billboard Top Pop Albums chart; for EPA 4041 from the newly inaugurated 1957 EP chart

"Teddy Bear" and "Loving You" were released as a single and charted at, respectively, number one and number twenty on Billboard's Top 20 charts.

1997 and 2005 reissue bonus tracks
Loving You was issued on CD with the originally album's 12 songs plus the following bonus tracks:

2006 Follow That Dream release
Disc 1

Disc 2
The February 14 Session 
1-12. "Loving You" 
13-34. "Loving You" 
35-50. "Loving You"

Personnel
The Blue Moon Boys
 Elvis Presley – vocals, acoustic guitar, percussion on “(Let Me Be Your) Teddy Bear” (uncertain)
 Scotty Moore – electric guitar
 Bill Black – double bass
 D. J. Fontana – drums

The Jordanaires
 Gordon Stoker – piano on "Mean Woman Blues" and "Got a Lot o' Livin' to Do", percussion on "Have I Told You Lately That I Love You?" (uncertain), backing vocals 
 Hoyt Hawkins – organ on "Blueberry Hill", "Have I Told You Lately That I Love You?" and "Is It So Strange", piano (uncertain), backing vocals 
 Hugh Jarrett – backing vocals 
 Neal Matthews – backing vocals

Additional personnel 
 Dudley Brooks – piano on "Loving You", "Blueberry Hill", "True Love", "Don't Leave Me Now", "Have I Told You Lately That I Love You?", "I Need You So", "Is It So Strange", "One Night (of sin)" and "When It Rains, It Really Pours"
 George Fields – harmonica on "Party" 
 Tiny Timbrell – acoustic guitar on "(Let Me Be Your) Teddy Bear", "Lonesome Cowboy", "Hot Dog" and "Party"

Charts

Certifications

See also
 Loving You (1957 film)

References

External links

 LPM-1515 Loving You Guide part of The Elvis Presley Record Research Database
 Loving You Special Edition FTD CD Information: http://shop.elvis.com.au/prod1295.htm

1957 soundtrack albums
Elvis Presley soundtracks
RCA Victor soundtracks
Musical film soundtracks
Drama film soundtracks